El Espinar is a Spanish town located 65 kilometres away from Madrid city centre, more precisely heading northwest, in the northern slope of the Sistema Central mountain range.
It belongs to the province of Segovia and to the autonomous Community of Castile and León, although the town centre is located less than 10 kilometres away to the boundary with the nearby autonomous Community of Madrid.
The fastest way to go from El Espinar to the nearest country where English is the main official language is via Madrid airport to London. So, going from El Espinar to Madrid airport takes roughly 75 minutes without traffic jams, then about 90 minutes required for check in and boarding, and then the two-hour average flight time up to London.
According to the 2022 census (INE), El Espinar has 9,662 inhabitants.

Toponimy 
The word "espinar" seems to be related with the  Spanish word "espino", and therefore with the  Latin word "spina", which in  English means "thorny shrubs", as there are a lot of them in this area, such as  common hawthorn. So, although the word "pino", which means "pine tree" is also similar to "espinar", according to experts, the most likely explanation is the one referred to "spina".

History 

The documented history of El Espinar dates from the 11th century, even though the area has been inhabited since the Iron Age. In fact, in September 2016 was found the settlement of Canto Los Hierros in a nearby mountain located south of town, just at 1,700 metres above sea level. The settlement, dated back to the Iron Age, covered about seventy hectares and included about one hundred of houses, few traces of walls and quite a lot of iron items. This kind of ancient settlement at such a high altitude is considered unique within Europe.
In 1293 the town received the foundation document called as Carta Puebla, which makes the town independent from the city of Segovia. The Carta Puebla was renewed later in 1317 and in 1368, which allowed the municipality to increase its territory.
During the 18th century, both the economy and the population boosted because of the sheep wool production and for the replacement of the farthest mountain pass of La Fuenfría by the nearest one of Los Leones as the safest, main mountain pass to travel between Madrid and the northwestern quadrant of the Iberian Peninsula.
In 1888, the railway between Madrid and Segovia was built, so the town experienced a boost as less time was needed to travel from El Espinar to both Madrid and Segovia.
In the early 20th century, the town became more and more famous for people from Madrid as a place to spend summer holidays whilst keeping away from the hotter Madrid's summers. During the early 21st century, the town increased its population as more and more people from Madrid moved to the area to live permanently there whilst working elsewhere in Madrid as commuters.

Geography and climate

Geography 

El Espinar is located in the far south of Segovia province. It's embedded by the mountains of the Sistema Central by the north, the east and the south, and only the west and the northwest are partially open to the high northern plateau. The altitude from the entire local territory range from 2,169 to 1,050 metres above sea level, although the inhabited areas are located between 1,100 and 1,200 metres above sea level.
From the top of the mountains located at the eastern limit of the local territory, the skyline of Madrid is easily seen during clear days. From the mountains located at the western and northern limits, there is a great view of the high northern plateau.
The town is located in the upper Moros valley, so the Moros river is a tributary of the Eresma, and then the Eresma is a tributary of the Duero.
There are some beautiful natural swimming pools in the wild named as La Panera, just by the Moros river in the middle of the pine forest.

Climate 

El Espinar has a mediterranean climate with strong continental influence because of its location in the centre of the Iberian Peninsula, and it's also influenced by its high altitude.
Summer tend to be warm but not hot at all, except for few days when hot spells due to heat waves coming from North Africa hit the centre of the Iberian Peninsula.

Summer is the driest season, as only few thunderstorms are able to bring some rain during July and August. When thunderstorms happen, they usually occur at early afternoon. However, thunder at night during warm summer nights is not rare at all. May and June are usually the most thundery months of the year, whereas January and February are the less thundery ones.
Autumn and spring are both the two equal rainiest seasons; winter is a little bit drier but is not bone dry like summer.
The yearly average precipitation range from 700 to 900 mm, but tend to be irregular and severe drought extending beyond summer months is not unheard of.

Snowfall can happen from late November to mid-April, and heavy snowfalls with snow depth up to 40 centimetres or more in a row usually happen at least once every three or four years.

July is the warmest month with an average high of 28 °C and an average low of 13 °C; January is the coldest month with an average high of 6 °C and an average low of -1 °C. During heavy cold waves, low temperatures can drop to -15 °C; on the other hand, during heavy heat waves, high temperatures can reach 36 °C.

Fauna and flora 

The flora resembles pretty much mediterranean, but some deciduous trees also cover some areas within the local territory of El Espinar.
The southern and the eastern mountains are peculiarly wooded mainly by Pinus Sylvestris, whereas the northern and western areas are less wooded by oaks forming the so-called dehesa and by grasslands. The mountains above 1,900 metres are wooded by shrubland as winter there is harsh and long, whereas summer is short and dry, which prevents almost any type of big trees.
On the other hand, below 1,200 metres, there are some Populus alba narrow forests following the many streams that irrigate the whole area.

Wildlife is represented by many animals, such as roe deer, wild boar, badger, weasel, fox, Spanish imperial eagle, Eurasian black vulture and Graellsia Isabellae.

There is a great facility and visitor centre to spot scavenger birds located besides the SG-500 secondary road heading towards Campo Azálvaro.  
The town is also famous for tourism focused on collect edible mushrooms, but the local law stated that anyone interested in it must pay for a permit fee.

Transport

Roads 

There are two toll motorways and two main roads which serve the local territory, just the motorways AP-6 and AP-61 and the main roads N-6 and N-603.
The AP-6 is the motorway that link Madrid with the far northwest of Spain up to La Coruña by more than 500 kilometres, although its toll only applies between the Guadarrama tunnel and Adanero (about 35 kilometres). 
The AP-61 is the link between El Espinar and Segovia by 33 kilometres.
The N-6 is the alternative route for the AP-6 to avoid the toll, and the same applies for the N-603 to avoid the AP-61 toll.

Train 

The town is served by the normal railroad between Madrid and Segovia, not by the high speed one. The railroad has three halts and one station within the local territory of El Espinar, therefore ordered from southeast to northwest there are the halts of Gudillos, San Rafael, the station of Estación de El Espinar and finally the halt of Los Ángeles de San Rafael.
The town council has requested several times to include the railroad across the town inside the commuter railroad of Madrid, but it has not been done yet.  However, the railroad works "de facto" as any other commuter railroad of Madrid because of the operating trains and the technical are the same.

Bus 

There is an urban bus that connects the four districts of town, which is often referred to as "La Carrula". Thus, there is another bus route uses to link the town with both Segovia and the madrilenian interchange transport hub of Moncloa; they usually run as direct buses to the two cities, but sometimes do their way by stopping in all the towns located in between.

Economy 

El Espinar has been living for centuries by logging and by sheep wool industry,  although since mid 20th century most people work in the service sector. Food and aluminium industries also has been playing an important role in the economy of El Espinar since late 20th century.

Sport 

El Espinar is represented by teams in the major national sports, such as football, five-a-side football, basketball, handball, cycling, equestrian sports, and golf. However, football is the most famous one as there are several teams based in the town, including female football teams as well. Hiking is also a popular, eco-friendly practice because there are so many hiking trails around.
Since 1986, every year in July, the town held the Open Castilla y León international tennis tournament.

There is also a golf course that consist in nine holes, which is located heading west of town towards Campo Azálvaro.
Sometimes, especially during the pre-season, the Atlético Madrid uses to gate together in the district of Los Ángeles de San Rafael, one of four districts of town. 
Apart from the natural swimming pool by the Moros river located in the middle of the pine forest near the district named Estación de El Espinar, there are also two outdoor swimming pools and one indoor swimming pool with gym and sauna facilities.

See also 
 La Pinareja

References

Municipalities in the Province of Segovia